Kurt Herbst (born 22 December 1940) is an Austrian weightlifter. He competed at the 1960 Summer Olympics and the 1964 Summer Olympics.

References

1940 births
Living people
Austrian male weightlifters
Olympic weightlifters of Austria
Weightlifters at the 1960 Summer Olympics
Weightlifters at the 1964 Summer Olympics
Sportspeople from Vienna
20th-century Austrian people